A Miser Brothers’ Christmas is a stop motion spin-off special based on some of the characters from the 1974 Rankin-Bass special The Year Without a Santa Claus. Distributed by Warner Bros. Animation under their Warner Premiere label (the rights holders of the post-1974 Rankin-Bass library) and Toronto-based Cuppa Coffee Studios, the one-hour special premiered on ABC Family on Saturday, December 13, 2008, during the network's annual The 25 Days of Christmas programming.

Mickey Rooney (at age 88) and George S. Irving (at age 86) reprised their respective roles as Santa Claus and Heat Miser. Snow Miser (originally portrayed by Dick Shawn who died in 1987) was voiced by Juan Chioran, while Mrs. Claus (voiced in the original by Shirley Booth who died in 1992) was portrayed by Catherine Disher. The movie aimed to emulate the Rankin/Bass animation style. This is the last Christmas special to feature Mickey Rooney as Santa Claus, as he died in 2014, as well as the last time George Irving voiced Heat Miser, as he died in 2016.

Plot
The feuding Miser Brothers (Heat and Snow) attend their family reunion with Mother Nature and their fellow siblings including the North Wind, Earthquake, Thunder and Lightning, and the Tides. North Wind passively asks Mother Nature what might happen if Santa would be unable to complete his duties on Christmas. She responds that North Wind would take control instead. Heat then begins to call out Snow for trying to "give global warming a bad name". Snow responds by talking about Heat's attempts to scare people with reports of a second Ice Age. Heat then reprimands Snow for claiming Iceland as his own, which barely has any ice. Snow then calls out Heat for claiming Greenland as his own because it's full of ice. The brothers then fight each other. Mother Nature ends the fight.

Despite his dashing appearance and veneer of flattery and devotion toward Mother Nature, the North Wind is far more malevolent than either of his brothers. Self-absorbed and vain, the North Wind is fixated with the idea of replacing Santa Claus as a way to achieve personal glory. Beginning his machinations, He then sends two of his minions to crash Santa's Super-Sleigh designed by his mechanic Tinsel, causing Santa to injure his back after falling in the middle of a fight between the brothers as he unintentionally crosses into their domain.

Despite what she told the North Wind before and having been informed by Mrs. Claus about what happened to Santa, Mother Nature assigns the Miser Brothers the responsibility of running the toy factory. Their fighting continues as they move through several workshop stations. The North Wind hatches a new plan to keep them fighting so it would appear as if they ruined Christmas themselves, but Mrs. Claus convinces the Miser Brothers to put aside their differences and cooperate by showing them the Naughty/Nice list station. The brothers' history is revealed, showing they've always been on Santa's naughty list for mutual bickering. Upon learning the error of their ways, they begin working together and successfully get work back up to speed. However, the North Wind hatches a plan to destroy their truce and get them fighting again, leaving Santa to deliver the toys and giving North Wind the chance to finish him off.

On Christmas Eve, the North Wind's minions surreptitiously attach heating and cooling units to the sleigh, apparently capable of heating or cooling entire regions of the planet. The discovery causes the Miser Brothers to blame each other. With them fighting again, Santa has no choice but to drive the sleigh as North Wind planned. After Santa leaves, Tinsel discovers the super-sleigh has been sabotaged, which stops the Misers' fight as they realize that neither of them was responsible for injuring Santa. Upon finding one of North Wind's Christmas cards with him dressed as Santa, the Misers realize the truth about their brother and comprehend his plan. Meanwhile, the North Wind attacks Santa's sleigh in flight, whipping up a vortex to consume Santa, but the Miser Brothers, with the aid of Tinsel and a team of young reindeer, save Santa in the nick of time.

The North Wind's cover is blown and Mother Nature sentences him to do household chores for the next several thousand years as punishment for trying to finish off Santa and making his brothers fight. With North Wind thwarted, the brothers learn they've finally made the nice list. They deliver the presents for Santa and give gifts to each other in the process, making peace between them and ending their feud.

Cast
 Mickey Rooney as Santa Claus
 George S. Irving as Heat Miser
 Juan Chioran as Snow Miser
 Catherine Disher as Mrs. Claus, Reindeer Elf
 Brad Adamson as North Wind
 Patricia Hamilton as Mother Nature
 Peter Oldring as Bob, Elf #1
 Susan Roman as Tinsel, Dr. Noel

Reception
The movie had 3.7 million viewers in its first airing, as determined by Nielsen ratings. It received a nomination for "Best Animated Television Production Produced for Children" in the 36th Annual Annie Awards.

See also
 Santa Claus in film
 List of Christmas films

References

External links

 

Animated Christmas films
Animated Christmas television specials
American animated fantasy films
2008 films
Canadian animated fantasy films
Film spin-offs
2000s American television specials
Canadian television specials
Christmas television specials
Santa Claus in film
Stop-motion animated short films
Warner Bros. Animation animated films
Santa Claus in television
2008 television specials
2000s American films
2000s Canadian films